Martin Freeman (born 1971) is an English actor.

Martin Freeman may also refer to:

 Martin Freeman (sailor) (1814–1894), American Civil War sailor and Medal of Honor recipient
 Martin Henry Freeman (1826–1889), American-Liberian academic administrator
 A. Martin Freeman (1878–1959), British scholar of Irish texts and music
 Martin Joseph Freeman (1899–1969), American scholar of English literature and novelist

See also
Martin Freedman, judge
Martin Friedman (disambiguation)